

Fixed telephony 
The area codes in Pakistan consists of two to five digits; generally smaller the city, longer the prefix. All large cities have two-digit codes. The smaller towns might have six digital whereas big cities have seven digit numbers. Azad Kashmir telephone lines contain five digits. On 1 July 2009, telephone numbers in Karachi and Lahore were changed from seven digits to eight digits. This was accomplished by adding 9 to the beginning of all phone numbers that started with a 9 i.e. government and semi-government lines and adding 3 to all other lines.

The following is the list of dialling codes for various cities and districts in Pakistan.

See also
Telephone numbers in Pakistan

References

ITU allocations list

External links
 PTCL - Official site

Pakistan
Dialing Codes